The North-Western State Medical University named after I.I. Mechnikov (NWSMU), until 2011 St. Petersburg I. I. Mechnikov State Medical Academy (SPSMA), is a public university located in St. Petersburg, Russian Federation. The NWSMU is one of the oldest and largest Russian Higher Medical Schools. Over its 112 years of history, the Academy remains a leading institution of Russia in medicine and training specialists in preventive and clinical medicine.  It is often called the Second Medical College in St. Petersburg because of its renaming in 1920 (see below), relative to Saint Petersburg State Medical University, which is called the First Medical College. The university is currently constructing the largest infectious diseases hospital in Saint Petersburg, a title formerly claimed by the Botkin hospital.

The NWSMU has a long tradition of educating Russian and international students. More than 35,000 physicians graduated from the university. Since beginning the international program in 1947 there have been more than 3500 international graduates from more than 50 countries. Currently there is a total student population of over 5,000. The university was established in 2011 following a merger of SPSMA with the St. Petersburg Medical Academy for Postgraduate Studies.

History
The NWSMU was established in 1907 under the direction of academician Vladimir Bekhterev and developed by the Russian Government through the Ministry of Health on the basis of the laws of Russian Federation.

Name changes
 1907–1920 - Medical Faculty of PsychoNeurological Institute
 1920–1936 - Second Leningrad Medical Institute
 1936–1946 - The Institute united with a city hospital and named after Nobel Laureate Ilya Ilyich Mechnikov
 1946–1994 - Leningrad Medical Institute of Sanitary and Hygiene by the order of the Board of Ministers of the USSR (N 14077 from 22.12.1946)
 1994–1995 - St. Petersburg State Medical Academy (WHO Directory, 7 ed., page 329)
 1995–2011 - The SPSMA was named after the great Russian scientist I. I. Mechnikov (order N 1307-p, dated 22.12.1995)
 2011–Present -  The St. Petersburg I. I. Mechnikov State Medical Academy was renamed to North-Western State Medical University named after I.I. Mechnikov, specializing in the provision of health care to the Northwestern Federal District of the Russian Federation

Notable graduates
Pyotr Anokhin (1926) (Cybernetics, Theory of functional systems)
Sergey Elizarovskiy (1934) (World War II surgeon, Stomatology)
Aleksandr Panov (1928)
Ivan Gevorkian (1930) Surgeon and scientist.
Sergey Mardashyov (1930)
Anatoliy Portnov (1914–2006), psychiatrist (ru)
Ekaterina Mikhailova-Demina (1950) (Soviet war heroine, doctor)

See also
Saint Petersburg State Medical University

References

External links
  
 Old official home page

Medical schools in Russia
Universities in Saint Petersburg
Education in the Soviet Union